Mongi Ben Brahim (born 3 February 1955) is a retired Tunisian football striker.

References

1955 births
Living people
Tunisian footballers
FC La Chaux-de-Fonds players
FC Sion players
BSC Young Boys players
FC Martigny-Sports players
Swiss Super League players
Association football forwards
Tunisian expatriate footballers
Expatriate footballers in Switzerland
Tunisian expatriate sportspeople in Switzerland